Almost Summer is a 1978 American comedy film directed by Martin Davidson, and produced by Motown Productions for Universal Pictures. It is the only Motown theatrical feature not to center on African-American characters. Set in a generic Southern California high school, the plot revolves around a student council election that stirs up assorted petty jealousies among various characters.

Though not successful at the box office, the film has since acquired a certain degree of historical importance because many observers consider it to be the first of a series of distinctive "youth genre" films of which more prominent examples include Fast Times at Ridgemont High and The Breakfast Club.

Plot

Bobby DeVito schemes to get even when Christine is able to get high school hunk Grant knocked out of the race for class president and thus allowing her to run unopposed. For revenge, Bobby decides to nominate a shy new kid Darryl as her challenger. Darryl is initially unsure about taking on the challenge, but eventually gets into it only to eventually drop out himself when he realizes Bobby has used some underhanded tricks in order to help him win.

Cast

Production
The best-known actors to star in the film were Bruno Kirby as Bobby DeVito and Tim Matheson in the role of Kevin Hawkins. The film features three professional skateboarders: Bryan Beardsley, Ty Page, and Mark Bowden. Also of note is the scene between two future characters (Hayward and Coolidge) of the TV series The White Shadow, when Dean Hampton (Thomas Carter) tries to convince basketball star Scottie (Byron Stewart) to run for president.

Outdoor scenes were filmed at Verdugo Hills High School in Tujunga, California.

Release
The film was released regionally in the United States in Dallas and Oklahoma City on April 21, 1978. The film's nationwide release was delayed until September 22, 1978.

Reception
The film was rated PG by the Motion Picture Association of America, but earned a B — "objectionable in part" — rating from the United States Conference of Catholic Bishops' Office for Film and Broadcasting; the latter body observed that "the film presents in uncritical fashion a suffocatingly materialistic and amoral environment, has offensive jokes at the expense of people with physical disabilities, and flaunts a gratuitous bit of nudity."

Soundtrack
Most of the soundtrack was written by Mike Love of the Beach Boys and performed by a studio band assembled by Love known as Celebration.

The title song, which became a mid-level hit single (U.S. #28, Canada #30), opens with the lyrics "Susie wants to be a lady director, and Eddie wants to drive a hearse; Johnny wants to be a doctor or lawyer, and Linda wants to be a nurse" — reflecting a total lack of world-changing idealism on the part of the teenage characters.

See also
List of American films of 1978

References

External links
 
 
 
 
 
 

1978 films
1978 comedy films
American high school films
American teen comedy films
1970s English-language films
Films directed by Martin Davidson
Films set in California
Motown Productions films
Universal Pictures films
1970s American films